Yelsui (also Romanized as Yelsū’ī) is a village in Angut-e Sharqi Rural District, Anguti District, Germi County, Ardabil Province, Iran. At the 2006 census, its population was 270, in 60 families.

References 

Tageo

Towns and villages in Germi County